Kim Gyeong-min (born 15 August 1990) is a South Korean footballer for Hwaseong FC of K3 League.

References

External links 
 

1990 births
Living people
South Korean footballers
K League 1 players
Incheon United FC players
Bucheon FC 1995 players
Gimcheon Sangmu FC players
Association football defenders